An open prison (open jail) is any jail in which the prisoners are trusted to complete sentences with minimal supervision and perimeter security and are often not locked up in their prison cells. Prisoners may be permitted to take up employment while serving their sentence.

In the UK, open prisons are often part of a rehabilitation plan for prisoners moved from closed prisons. They may be designated "training prisons" and are only for prisoners considered a low risk to the public.

The idea of an open prison is often criticised by members of the public and politicians, despite its success towards rehabilitation compared to older, more draconian methods. Prisoners in open jails do not have complete freedom and are only allowed to leave the premises for specific purposes, such as going to an outside job. In Ireland, there has been controversy about the level of escape from open prisons, attributed to the use of the prison by the Irish Prison Service not to transfer prisoners suitable for open conditions but to reduce overcrowding in the closed prisons. The idea of open prisons is to rehabilitate prisoners rather than to punish them.

Examples of open prisons

India
Nettukaltheri Open Prison & Correctional Home, Thiruvananthapuram
Cheemeni Open Prison & Correctional Home, Kasaragod
Poojapura Women Open Prison & Correctional Home, Thiruvananthapuram
Yerwada Open Jail, in Yerwada, Pune, Maharashtra
Tihar Open Jail, in Delhi

Ireland
Loughan House, Blacklion, County Cavan, Ireland
Shelton Abbey Prison, Arklow, County Wicklow, Ireland

Philippines
Iwahig Prison and Penal Farm

United Kingdom
England (men's)
HM Prison Ford, Ford, West Sussex
HM Prison Leyhill, South Gloucestershire
HM Prison Hatfield, South Yorkshire
HM Prison Haverigg, Cumbria
HM Prison Thorn Cross, Cheshire
HM Prison Hollesley Bay, Suffolk
HM Prison Kirkham, Lancashire
HM Prison Kirklevington Grange, North Yorkshire
HM Prison North Sea Camp, Lincolnshire
HM Prison Spring Hill, Buckinghamshire
HM Prison Standford Hill, Kent
HM Prison Sudbury, Derbyshire
England (women's)
HM Prison Askham Grange, York 
HM Prison East Sutton Park, Kent 
Wales
HM Prison Prescoed,  Monmouthshire
Scotland
HM Prison Castle Huntly, Longforgan, Perth and Kinross

Offener Vollzug in Germany
In Germany the "Offener Vollzug" is part of the rehabilitation process for about 16% of prisoners.

In fiction
Trumble, a fictional open prison in Florida, is the major setting for John Grisham's novel The Brethren.

See also
Prison security categories in the United Kingdom
House arrest
Club Fed, similar phenomenon in US and Canada

References

Prisons